The Ministry of Finance of Libya is the finance ministry responsible for public finances of Libya.

Ministers of Finance of the Kingdom of Libya
Mansour Qadara, 1951-1953
Abu Bakr Naama, 1953
Ali Aneizi, 1953-1955
Ali Sahli, 1955-1956
Ismail bin Lamin, 1956-1960
Muhammad Osman Said, 1960
Salim Lutfi al-Qadi, 1960-1961
Ahmed al-Hasairi, 1961-1962
Mohamed Suleiman Bourbaida, 1962-1963-?
Mansour bin Qadara, ?-1964
Salim Lutfi al-Qadi, 1964-1965
Omar Baroni, 1965
Salim Lutfi al-Qadi, 1965-1968
Al-Hadi Qaud, 1968-1969

Ministers of Treasury of the Libyan Arab Republic 
Mahmud Suleiman Maghribi, 1969-1970
Mohamed Hulayel El Rabi'i, 1970
Umar Muhayshi, 1970
Abdessalam Jalloud, 1970-1972
Muhammad az-Zaruq Rajab, 1972-1977

Secretaries of Finance of the Great Socialist People's Libyan Arab Jamahiriya 
Muhammad az-Zaruq Rajab, 1977-1981
Muhammad al-Qasim Sharlalah, 1981-1987
Muhammad al-Madani al-Bukhari, 1987-1994
Muhammad Bayt al-Mal, 1994-2001
Abd al-Salam al-Burayni, 2001-2004
Muhammad al-Huwayj, 2004-2006
Ahmed Munaysi Abd-al-Hamid, 2006-2007
Muhammad al-Huwayj, 2007-2009
Abd-al-Hafid Mahmud al-Zulaytini, March 2009 - August 2011

Ministers of Finance since 2011
Note: Several rival governments since 2014. 
NTC: Hasan Zaglam, December 2011 - October 2012
GNC: Alkilani Abdel-Qadir al-Jazi, November 2012 - March 2014
GNC: Haithem Saed Jalgham, March 2014 - August 2014
GNC: Milud Ahmed Khalifa Hamid, May 2014 - June 2014
NSG: Younis al-Barasi, September 2014 – August 2015
NSG: Osama Ben Naji, August 2015 – April 2016???
GNA: Fakhr Muftah Bufernah, April 2016 - ?
GNA: Fakhir Abu Farna, ?- July 2016
GNA: Osama Hammad, November 2016 - October 2018
GNA: Faraj Boumtari, October 2018 - March 2021
HoR: Kamal Al-Hassi, September 2014 - May 2020
HoR: Imrajaa Ghaith, May 2020 -March 2021
GNU: Khaled Al-Mabrouk Abdullah, March 2021 – present

See also
Central Bank of Libya

Notes

External links 
 Ministry of the Finance of Libya (HoR)

Libya
Government of Libya